Lieutenant-General Sir John Bruce Hope, 7th Baronet (c. 1684 – 5 June 1766) was a Scottish soldier and politician who was 7th Baronet Hope of Craighall.

Life

He was born John Hope, the third son of Sir Thomas Hope, 4th Baronet of Craighall by his wife Anne, daughter and heiress of Sir William Bruce, 1st Baronet of Kinross. He succeeded his elder brothers in the Hope baronetcy and in their mother's estate of Kinross, assuming the additional surname of Bruce.

Hope was a lieutenant and captain in the 2nd Troop Horse Grenadier Guards in 1708, and captain and lieutenant-colonel in the 3rd Regiment of Foot Guards the same year. He was lieutenant-colonel of the 26th Regiment of Foot from 1716 to 1718, and Governor of Bermuda from 1721 to 1727. He sat in Parliament as Member for Kinross-shire from 1727 to 1734 and from 1741 to 1747; he was hereditary sheriff of the county from about 1715 until the Heritable Jurisdictions Act. He was colonel of a regiment of foot from 1743 to 1748, and was promoted major-general in 1754 and lieutenant-general in 1758.

Family
Bruce Hope married firstly Charlotte, daughter of Sir Charles Halkett, 1st Baronet of Pitfirrane; they had no children. His second wife was Marianne, daughter of the Rev. William Denune, of Pencaitland. Their only surviving child, Anne, who married Thomas Williamson at Edinburgh in 1774, did not inherit the Kinross estates, which instead went to the descendants of Bruce Hope's mother by her second husband, Sir John Carstairs of Kilconquhar.

References

Sources
 George Edward Cokayne, ", [...] sometime [...] " in The Complete Baronetage, volume II (1902) page 344.
 Paula Watson, HOPE, John (c.1684-1766), of Culdraines. in The History of Parliament: the House of Commons 1715-1754 (1970).
 

1680s births
1766 deaths
John
Baronets in the Baronetage of Nova Scotia
Scots Guards officers
Cameronians officers
British Army lieutenant generals
British MPs 1727–1734
British MPs 1741–1747
Governors of Bermuda
Members of the Parliament of Great Britain for Scottish constituencies